SerenityOS is a free and open source desktop operating system that has been in continuous development since 2018. Initially the one-man project of Swedish programmer Andreas Kling, SerenityOS is now developed by a community of hobbyists. The system supports the x86-64 instruction set, features a preemptive kernel, and hosts multiple complex applications including its own web browser and integrated development environment (IDE).

History 

Kling began developing the project in part to aid his recovery from addiction, and as such the name of the project derives from the Serenity Prayer. As of 2021, Kling works full-time on SerenityOS, supported by community donations.

Features 
SerenityOS aims to be a modern Unix-like operating system, with a look and feel that emulates 1990s operating systems such as Microsoft Windows and Mac OS. Incorporating third-party code into the system is discouraged. The web browser for instance, does not use a preexisting web engine such as WebKit, instead using its own known as LibWeb. There is a collection of ported software, such as GCC, Git and Doom, with varying levels of functionality.

Development does not adhere to a release cycle; as such, there are no releases. Additionally, no binary distributions are provided and prospects are expected to build the system from source. The system is written in what the authors call "Serenity C++", a variant of C++ that lacks exceptions and features its own standard library.

The relative popularity of SerenityOS compared to other hobbyist systems is in part due to the modest success of Kling's YouTube channel, where he uploads videos of him developing parts of the system alongside demos and monthly progress updates.

Reception 

Jim Salter of Ars Technica regarded the use of the ext2 file system as his least favorite feature of the operating system. Compared to TempleOS (another operating system well known in the hobbyist community), he considered it more accessible. For less technical users that are looking for a mid–to–late 90s reminiscent visual style, the Xfce Chicago95 theme or the Redmond Project has been recommended instead.

References

External links 

 Project Homepage
 Source Repository

Hobbyist operating systems
Unix variants
Free software programmed in C++
Free software operating systems
Software using the BSD license
2018 software